Draganodes is a monotypic moth genus of the family Erebidae. Its only species, Draganodes coronata, is found in Japan. Both the genus and the species were first described by Shigero Sugi in 1982.

References

Calpinae
Monotypic moth genera